St Wynwallow's Church, Landewednack, is the parish church of Landewednack parish in Cornwall, England, United Kingdom. It was founded about 600 AD but the present structure dates to the twelfth century.

History and description
The church is dedicated to St Winwaloe and is Church of England. St Winwaloe was the third son of a Cornish couple who moved to Brittany. There he founded the monastery of Landévennec. There is no evidence that he visited Cornwall, and the church may have been founded by one of the monks from Landévennec, or perhaps by St Winwaloe's elder brother, Wennac. Nothing remains of the original building.

The oldest part of the current church building is the twelfth century Norman doorway. The substantial tower is constructed of blocks of granite and serpentine giving it a chequer-board appearance. Other notable features are the serpentine pulpit and the font, which dates to the fifteenth century;there is also a Victorian lectern made of polished serpentine.

The church was restored in the thirteenth century when the porch was added and in the fifteenth century when a new window was inserted into the tower. It is now a Grade I listed building. An inscription on the font records the name of Master Richard Bolham, rector from 1404 to 1442 who may have been responsible for the 15th-century work. The last Cornish language sermon was preached here in 1674, though this claim has also been made for the churches of Towednack and Ludgvan.

The bells are very old and among the oldest bells in Cornwall; the tenor bell (on the floor) and another bell are dated 1550, but a third bell is about a century older than that. There is a ringing peal of six bells and the old tenor bell has been kept on the floor of the church. The 5th bell is unusually slightly heavier than the tenor bell which has a weight of 8-1-19.

The settlements of Grade, Ruan Major and Ruan Minor were united into a single civil parish called Grade-Ruan in 1934. The former parish church of Ruan Major is now in ruins. St Wynwallow's Church is part of a group of parishes comprising:
St Grada & Holy Cross Church, Grade
St Wynwallow's Church, Landewednack
St Rumon's Church, Ruan Minor
St Mary's Church, Cadgwith

References

Church of England church buildings in Cornwall
Grade I listed churches in Cornwall
St Wynwallow's Church